Galliate is a comune (municipality) in the Province of Novara in the Italian region Piedmont, located about  northeast of Turin, about  northwest Milan and about  northeast of Novara.

Galliate borders the following municipalities: Cameri, Novara, Romentino, Cuggiono, Bernate Ticino, Robecchetto con Induno, Turbigo. It is home to a late-15th-century castle built under the Sforza family of Milan, and to the 16th-century sanctuary of Varallino, designed by Pellegrino Tibaldi.

The commune's territory is included in the Ticino River Natural Park.

Notable Galliatesi 
 Achille Varzi (1904–1948), Grand Prix motor racing champion.
 Massimo Maccarone (born 1979), Italian international footballer.

References

External links
 Official website

Cities and towns in Piedmont